Kopačka is a folklore musical ensemble from Dramče, North Macedonia. Founded in 1948, it is the oldest of its kind in North Macedonia, even older than the most famous Macedonian folklore ensemble Tanec, which was founded in 1949. The ensemble is best known for the dance with the same name Kopačka.

In November 2008, the Kopačka ensemble marked its 60 years jubilee. There was also a guest ensemble from Melnik, Bulgaria.

See also 
 Kopačka (folk dance)

External links 
 Vest newspaper

Macedonian folk music groups